"Treat You Like a Queen" is a song released in 1999 by American R&B singer Rahsaan Patterson. The song was the lead single in support of his second studio album, Love in Stereo. The song peaked at NO. 61 on the Billboard Hot R&B Singles & Tracks chart.

Track listing
Promo, US CD" single

Charts

References

1999 singles
Rahsaan Patterson songs
Songs written by Rahsaan Patterson
1998 songs
MCA Records singles